In mathematics, the Kuratowski embedding allows one to view any metric space as a subset of some Banach space. It is named after Kazimierz Kuratowski.

The statement obviously holds for the empty space.
If (X,d) is a metric space, x0 is a point in X,  and Cb(X) denotes the Banach space of all bounded continuous real-valued functions on X with the supremum norm, then the map

defined by

is an isometry.

The above construction can be seen as embedding a pointed metric space into a Banach space.

The Kuratowski–Wojdysławski theorem states that every bounded metric space X is isometric to a closed subset of a convex subset of some Banach space. (N.B. the image of this embedding is closed in the convex subset, not necessarily in the Banach space.) Here we use the isometry

defined by

The convex set mentioned above is the convex hull of Ψ(X).

In both of these embedding theorems, we may replace Cb(X) by the Banach space ℓ ∞(X) of all bounded functions X → R, again with the supremum norm, since Cb(X) is a closed linear subspace of ℓ ∞(X).

These embedding results are useful because Banach spaces have a number of useful properties not shared by all metric spaces: they are vector spaces which allows one to add points and do elementary geometry involving lines and planes etc.; and they are complete. Given a function with codomain X, it is frequently desirable to extend this function to a larger domain, and this often requires simultaneously enlarging the codomain to a Banach space containing X.

History 

Formally speaking, this embedding was first introduced by Kuratowski,
but a very close variation of this embedding appears already in the paper of Fréchet where he first introduces the notion of metric space.

See also
Tight span, an embedding of any metric space into an injective metric space defined similarly to the Kuratowski embedding

References

Functional analysis
Metric geometry